Eric Ortiz Aparicio (born 19 May 1977 in Mexico City) is a Mexican professional boxer that competes in the light flyweight (108 lb) division.

Pro career
Ortiz turned pro in 1996 and in 2005 captured the vacant WBC light flyweight title with a TKO win over José Antonio Aguirre.  He lost the belt in his first defenCe to Brian Viloria.  The following year he challenged IBF light flyweight title holder Ulises Solís but lost via TKO.  After a couple of wins, he then lost in an eliminator to Z Gorres in 2007.

See also
List of WBC world champions
List of Mexican boxing world champions

External links 
 

1977 births
Light-flyweight boxers
Living people
Boxers from Mexico City
World Boxing Council champions
World light-flyweight boxing champions
World boxing champions
Mexican male boxers